In the state governments of the United States, 48 of the 50 states have the executive position of treasurer. New York abolished the position in 1926; duties were transferred to New York State Comptroller. Texas abolished the position of Texas State Treasurer in 1996, transferring the duties of that office to the Texas Comptroller of Public Accounts.

The state treasurer serves as the chief custodian of each state's treasury and as the state's head banker. Typically, they receive and deposit state monies, manages investments, and keeps track of budget surpluses and deficits. The position has powers and responsibilities similar to those of the United States Secretary of the Treasury and the Treasurer of the United States, or the chief financial officer of a corporation.

Current state treasurers or equivalents
In most states, the position is a statewide elected office, usually a constitutional office (that is, provided for in the state constitution). In some states the position is appointed by the governor as a member of the governor's cabinet.

See also
 Association of Public Treasurers of the United States and Canada
 California Municipal Treasurers Association (CMTA)
  California Society of Municipal Finance Officers (CSMFO)
  Government Finance Officers Association (GFOA)
  Government Finance Officers Association of Texas (GFOAT)
 State constitutional officer (United States)
 List of U.S. statewide elected officials

References

External links

 
State treasurer